Bimal Dasgupta (29 April 1910 – 3 April 2000), nicknamed "Makhan", was an Indian revolutionary and member of the Bengal Volunteers who carried out assassinations against British colonial officials in an attempt to secure Indian independence.

Family 
Bimal Dasgupta was born in Jhalokati District, Barishal in 1910. His father was Akhyay Kumar Dasgupta, an ayurvedic doctor. His mothers name was Sushila Devi. His father came to Midnapore permanently when he was only 4 years old. His parental uncle Hiralal Dasgupta was already lived here. They were four brothers and five sisters. He joined the Bengal Volunteers, a revolutionary organisation of British India.

Education
 He started his education at Mahendra babur Pathsala, Mir Bazar. Then he admitted at the Vidyasagar Vidyapith as a class 5 student at Hindu school from class 7 to class10. Hindu school was a private school at that time. Later he was came to the influence of Dinesh Gupta, who was a student of Midnapore College at that time. Dinesh Gupta came to Midnapore after the instruction of Netaji Subhas Chandra Bose and stayed with his brother Jyotish Gupta who was a lawyer in Midnapore judges court. This way Dasgupta joined Bengal Volunteers, a revolutionary organisation of British India. His paternal uncle was Hiralal Dasgupta, headmaster of Midnapore Collegiate School. He forced his uncle to patronize a handicraft fair at Colligete school premises and continued it till 7 April.

Revolutionary activities 

thumb|Bimal Dasgupta's name in Andaman Cellular Jail list , Port Blair 2009
Dinesh Gupta himself fought in the Battle of the Writers Buildings but somehow survived.  After discussion it was decided by the Bengal Volunteers group that the first target would be James Peddi. Peddi had already earned notoriety of his own. He would beat the salt satyagrahis to unconsciousness and even killed some of them by kicking them badly. Further, he would take the unarmed women to the open streets, strip them and leave them there. A list of four names was sent to Calcutta Headquarters of Bengal volunteers for approval. They were Shashanka Dasgupta, Phani Kundu, Jyoti Jibon Ghosh and Bimal Dasgupta. On 7 April at around 5:00 p.m Peddi came to the fair with two officers 16 trained police dogs, 16 body guards for prize distribution. He was busy in the exhibition when Jyoti Jiban Ghosh and Bimal Dasgupta suddenly shot at him. After the shootout they snatched a cycle and fled to the Salbani Jungle. There they boarded from two different railway stations, i.e., Godapiasal railway station and Salboni railway station, and reached Purulia by Gomo Passenger. After that they spent some days in Asansol and Kolkata. His uncle refused to give any information about the killers of Pedi and lost his job. He worked in Jharia coalfieldfor some time during this period. Some days later Bimal Dasgupta was again given the responsibility of killing Mr. Villiers, chief editor of the newspaper The Statesman of Clive Street. On July 29, 1931, he shot Villiers in his office. He got caught before he could take the cyanide out of his pocket. Police eventually found him as a defendant in the Pedi Murder case after he was assumed to be dead, as the revolutionary Kanailal Bhattacharjee, who killed Galik and was martyred under the name of Bimal Dasgupta (or Bimal Gupta) so that the police would stop searching for the real Bimal Dasgupta. The sacrifice of Shaheed Kanailal Bhattacharya, to remain anonymous and save another revolutionary from the hands of the police is rare in history. At the initiative of Netaji Subhash Chandra Bose, three barristers stood for the revolutionaries in the special tribunal. Jyotijivan Ghosh was acquitted and during cross-examination, key witness Sushil Das said, "Peddi's killer is not Bimal Dasgupta." To save Bimal Dasgupta, Raja Narendra Lal Khan of Medinipur had instructed Sushil Das to say so. Although Bimal Dasgupta was acquitted of the murder of Peddi, he was sentenced to ten years in prison in the Villiers murder case.

Prison Life

In the middle of 1932, he was sent to the Andaman Cellular Jail. In 1936 he went on a hunger strike to demand the status of a political prisoner. The fast was called off with the mediation of Netaji Subhash Chandra Bose and Muzaffar Ahmed. He was repatriated in 1938 but was not released. Bimal Dasgupta spent four years in various prisons in main land of Bengal.

Last life

After being freed in 1942 he was looking after the land in his home in Medinipur. He  worked as a sales inspector of Anandabazar newspaper after independence.

Death

He died on March 3, 2000.

References

1910 births
2000 deaths
Revolutionary movement for Indian independence
Indian nationalism
Indian people convicted of murder
Indian revolutionaries
People from Paschim Medinipur district
Revolutionaries from West Bengal
Indian independence activists from West Bengal